Józef Kwaciszewski (1890-1958) was a Polish general.

During World War I he was a member of the Polish Legions. He became the commander of the 18th Polish Infantry Division in 1928, and the 19th Polish Infantry Division in 1936. During the German invasion of Poland he commanded the 19th Division, which was a part of the Army Prusy. Following the Battle of Piotrków Trybunalski, he was captured by the Germans and spent the rest of the war in the German prisoner of war camps, mainly in Oflag VII-A Murnau.

References 

1890 births
1958 deaths
Polish generals of the Second Polish Republic
People from Krosno
Recipients of the Cross of Independence
Officers of the Order of Polonia Restituta
Recipients of the Silver Cross of the Virtuti Militari
Recipients of the Cross of Valour (Poland)
Recipients of the Gold Cross of Merit (Poland)
Polish legionnaires (World War I)
Polish prisoners of war in World War II
Polish September Campaign participants